Clara Rozier (born 28 August 1997) is a French ice hockey player and member of the French national ice hockey team, currently playing with HIFK Naiset of the Naisten Liiga (NSML).

She represented France at the 2019 IIHF Women's World Championship.

References

External links

1997 births
Living people
French women's ice hockey forwards
People from Évian-les-Bains
HIFK Naiset players
Expatriate ice hockey players in Finland
French expatriate ice hockey people
Sportspeople from Haute-Savoie